Gagik Khachatryan may refer to:
Gagik Khachatryan (politician)
Gagik Khachatryan (weightlifter)